Nehemiah Lamar Harden (born October 19, 2001), professionally known as SpotemGottem (stylized as SPOTEMGOTTEM), is an American rapper best known for his 2020 hit single "Beat Box", which peaked at number 12 on the Billboard Hot 100. He is signed to Geffen Records, Interscope Records and Rebel Music.

Legal issues 
In June 2017, Harden was arrested and charged with grand theft auto and carrying a concealed weapon in Duval County, Florida.

On July 15, 2021, he was arrested for aiming a handgun with a laser sight at a Miami Marriott hotel garage attendant and charged with aggravated assault with a firearm, firearm possession as a convicted felon, and accessory after the fact.

On September 17, 2021, Harden was shot in the hip in a drive-by shooting while driving his car on the I-95 freeway in Miami.

On June 26, 2022, Harden was arrested for fleeing from the police and reckless operation of a boat. The incident happened when Harden was driving a wave runner in a restricted area. When approached by an officer, Harden weaved through parked boats and swimmers to elude the officer.

Discography

Mixtapes

Singles

Notes

References 

2001 births
21st-century American rappers
American hip hop singers
American rappers
American male rappers
American male songwriters
Living people
Drill musicians
Rappers from Florida
African-American male rappers
Musicians from Jacksonville, Florida
African-American songwriters
21st-century American male musicians
American child musicians
21st-century African-American musicians
20th-century African-American people
21st-century American criminals
Southern hip hop musicians
American shooting survivors